Cork United F.C. may refer to:

 Cork United F.C. (1940–1948), a former League of Ireland team
 Cork United F.C. (1979–1982), a former League of Ireland team 
Founded on February 6, 1940, the Leesiders, in a titanic struggle with Munster rivals Waterford which went right to the wire in league and cup, carried off the double at the first attempt to not only become the first Cork team to do so but also the first to ever win the league championship.

Cork United was one of 9 clubs to be located in the city of Cork 

it was disbanded due to financial difficulties